The Goulburn Valley Football Netball League is an Australian rules football and netball competition based in the Goulburn Valley region of Victoria, Australia. It is a member of the Victorian Country Football League and has won the Victorian Country Football Championships in 2003 and 2005.

History
The league was initially called the Goulburn Valley District Football Association(GVDFA) and dates back to May, 1893. Clubs from the townships of Kyabram, Mooroopna, Nagambie, Nathalia, Numurkah, Shepparton, Shepparton Ramblers, Tatura, Undera and Wunghnu were present at the inaugural meeting. The five original clubs that made up the 1893 GVDFA draw were – Kyabram, Mooroopna, Shepparton, Shepparton Ramblers and Tatura with Mooroopna playing the Shepparton Ramblers in the 1893 GVDFA grand final.

Later clubs from Rushworth, Murchison, Tongala and Echuca would spend time in this league.

At the 1914 – GVDFA – Annual General Meeting, the club delegate's voted to change the name of the competition to the Goulburn Valley Football League to save a lot of confusion with another local football competition, the Goulburn Valley Football Association, which was based out of Numurkah, which was made up from club's in the northern Goulburn Valley region.

Between 1926 and 1936, there was a Goulburn Valley Second Eighteens Football Association competition that was based in and around Shepparton, that was superseded by the Goulburn Valley Football Association in 1937.

Prior to World War II this league used to play on Wednesday afternoon, but in 1939 the league decided to change to Saturday afternoon, Shepparton and Mooroopna objected and refused to play on Saturdays so both clubs went into recess.

In 1995 the league absorbed the clubs from the Tungamah Football League and had a second division for three seasons (1996–1998). These second division clubs left and formed the Central Goulburn Football League in 1999. This league ceased in 2005.

Current clubs

Former clubs

Avenel
Murchison
Prisoner of War Group 13
Rushworth

Shepparton Ramblers
Shepparton Preserving Company (SPC)
Stanhope
Stanhope-Girgarre
Toolamba
Undera

Premiers

Seniors

 1894 Mooroopna
 1895 Mooroopna
 1896 Mooroopna
 1897 No competition
 1898 Tatura
 1899 Shepparton
 1900 Tatura
 1901 Tatura
 1902 Tatura
 1903 Shepparton
 1904 Tatura
 1905 Tatura
 1906 Shepparton
 1907 Mooroopna
 1908 Shepparton
 1909 Shepparton
 1910 Murchison 
 1911 Shepparton
 1912 Shepparton
 1913 Shepparton
 1914 Rochester
 1915–1918 No competition due to World War I
 1919 Kyabram
 1920 Shepparton
 1921 Kyabram
 1922 Kyabram
 1923 Mooroopna

 1924 Mooroopna
 1925 Shepparton
 1926 Kyabram
 1927 Kyabram
 1928 Kyabram
 1929 Shepparton
 1930 Rushworth
 1931 Rushworth
 1932 Rushworth
 1933 Rushworth
 1934 Shepparton
 1935 Rushworth
 1936 Mooroopna 
 1937 Mooroopna 
 1938 Mooroopna 
 1939 Nagambie
 1940 Benalla
 1941–1945 No competition due to World War II
 1946 Nagambie
 1947 Nagambie

Grand Finals

Medal winners / Leading Goalkickers

2007 Ladder
																	

FINALS

2008 Ladder
																	

FINALS

2009 Ladder
																	

FINALS

2010 Ladder 
																	
																	
FINALS

2011 Ladder 
																	
																	
FINALS

2012 Ladder 
																	
																	
FINALS

References

External links
Official Goulburn Valley Football League Website
Full Points Footy Profile of the GVFL

Australian rules football competitions in Victoria (Australia)
Goulburn Valley Football League
1894 establishments in Australia
Netball leagues in Victoria (Australia)